You Too Can Have a Body Like Mine is the 2015 debut novel by Alexandra Kleeman. It was Kleeman's first novel, and was published by HarperCollins. It was longlisted for the Center for Fiction First Novel Prize, shortlisted for the NBCC Leonard Prize, and won the 2016 Bard Fiction Prize.

Plot summary
The novel concerns a woman, who is unnamed, and her roommate, B, and boyfriend, C.

References

2015 American novels
HarperCollins books
2015 debut novels